Ryan Beck & Co. was an investment banking and brokerage firm based in New Jersey. Since its acquisition in 2007, the firm has operated as a subsidiary of Stifel Financial.

History

The firm, originally known as John J. Ryan & Co., was founded in 1946 by John J. Ryan, a Lehman Brothers bond buyer. In 1951, Roy G. Beck, who had his own small firm, joined the firm working as the lead bond salesman.

In the early years, the firm focused on underwriting municipal bonds in New Jersey and grew relatively slowly. In 1966, John J. Ryan & Co. was named co-manager of the $179-million bond issue for the New Jersey Turnpike which established the firm as one of the leading underwriters of municipal bonds in New Jersey. Also, in the 1960s, the firm began to shift its focus toward financial services companies, particularly banks. In 1963, the firm formed a bank-stock trading and research subsidiary. In 1969, the company established a mergers and acquisitions department, which quickly earned a mandate to advise on the merger of the Bank of Sussex County into National Community Bank (later acquired by Bank of New York).

In 1986, the company completed an initial public offering on the New York Stock Exchange. In 1998, the firm was acquired by BankAtlantic. In 2002, Ryan Beck announced the acquisition of the bulk of the operations Gruntal & Co., one of the oldest investment banks in U.S. In 2007, the firm was sold to Stifel Financial.

References

Ryan Beck & Co. Company History. Funding Universe

Former investment banks of the United States
Companies based in New Jersey
Banks established in 1946
Banks disestablished in 2007
Defunct financial services companies of the United States
1946 establishments in New Jersey
2007 disestablishments in New Jersey
1998 mergers and acquisitions
2007 mergers and acquisitions